Aurelia, is a Mexican telenovela produced by Televisa and originally transmitted by Telesistema Mexicano.

Cast 
Patricia Morán
Enrique Aguilar
Pituka de Foronda
Sergio Bustamante
Graciela Doring
Mauricio Herrera
Josefina Escobedo
Alberto Galán

References

External links 

Mexican telenovelas
Televisa telenovelas
Spanish-language telenovelas
1968 telenovelas
1968 Mexican television series debuts